Final league standings for the 1920-21 St. Louis Soccer League.

League standings

External links
St. Louis Soccer Leagues (RSSSF)
The Year in American Soccer - 1921

1920-21
1920–21 domestic association football leagues
1920–21 in American soccer
St Louis Soccer
St Louis Soccer